Josina Cornelia "Josje" Huisman (born 16 February 1986, in Heusden) is a Dutch singer, actress, dancer, host and writer best known as the second blonde member of the girl group K3. She was the winner of the televised talent show  in 2009 and was part of the group until 2016.

Life and career

Early life 
Josina Cornelia Huisman was born in Heusden, the Netherlands. She is the daughter of a vicar. She took ballet class as a child at school. In 2008, Huisman completed her studies at the Dansacademie Lucia Marthas in Groningen. She took musical lessons.

K3 
Huisman entered the television talent contest K2 zoekt K3 where the winner would become the new third member of hit sensation K3, a Belgian group. The contest was broadcast in the Flemish-speaking part of Belgium and in the Netherlands. On 3 October 2009 Huisman won the much publicized talent show. She was the favorite of the viewers, the judges and the other two members of the band K3. By winning the contest, Huisman became a member of K3.

The first single with Huisman, Mamasé became very successful and went platinum. Becoming part of the group, Huisman moved to Antwerp, Belgium. While Huisman was a member of K3, the group released 4 albums, two movies and two television shows, performed in 7 tours and 1 musical. During her time as a member of the band, Huisman was a favorite subject of the tabloids, often publicizing about her relations with other celebrities, such as Gert Verhulst, Johnny de Mol and Kevin Janssens or her changing looks.

Besides K3, Huisman starred in the Dutch series Fashion Planet (2014) and took part in the reality contest Dansdate (2014) where she became the semi-finalist with her then-boyfriend, Kevin Janssens. She performed in the musical Wickie de Viking (2015-2016).

On 18 March 2015 K3 announced that the current band members would quit the band after finding new members. A new television talent contest,  aired. On 6 November 2015 the three new members of K3 were chosen. Following the show, the old and the new K3 launched a tour together. It was a goodbye tour for Huisman and the other old members and a debuting tour for the new members. At 8 May 2016 Huisman performed for the last time as a member of K3.

It-girl 
On 31 August 2016 Huisman released her first book, Dresscode Josje. On 1 October 2016 she was one of the celebrities entering a boxing contest to promote the new television channel, CAZ. She participated in December 2016, at the celebrity quiz, .

A new Beauty and the Beast (musical) premiered on 10 December 2016, at Flanders Expo in Ghent. Huisman performed as Belle.

Discography 

Studio albums

2009: MaMaSé!
2011: Alice in Wonderland
2011: Eyo!
2012: Engeltjes
2013: Loko le

Filmography

References

External links 
 Official site K3 
 

1986 births
Living people
People from Heusden
K3 (band) members
21st-century Dutch singers
21st-century Dutch women singers